Six Dance Lessons in Six Weeks is a 2014 Hungarian-American comedy-drama film starring Gena Rowlands and Cheyenne Jackson alongside a supporting cast including Jacki Weaver, Rita Moreno, Julian Sands and Anthony Zerbe.  The film was adapted by Richard Alfieri from his play of the same name and directed by Arthur Allan Seidelman. It was the final film of director of photography Vilmos Zsigmond, who died two years after the film's release in 2016.

Plot
A retired woman hires a dance instructor to give her private dance lessons at her home—one per week for six weeks. What begins as an antagonistic relationship turns into a close friendship as they dance together.

Cast
Gena Rowlands as Lily Harrison
Cheyenne Jackson as Michael Minetti
Julian Sands as Winslow Cunard
Jacki Weaver as Irene Mossbecker
Rita Moreno as Ida Barksdale
Kathleen Rose Perkins as Susie
Anthony Zerbe as Mr. Crumwald

Reception
The film has a 50% approval rating on Rotten Tomatoes based on 12 reviews, with an average score of 5.29/10. Stephen Whitty of The Star-Ledger referred to the film as "a very poor movie."  Nicolas Rapold of The New York Times wrote "The soppy, instructive story of acceptance feels handed down from another era, though Ms. Rowlands can fire off a one-liner at 20 paces, and she effortlessly conveys oh-my-oh-me adorable."

References

External links
 
 

Hungarian films based on plays
2014 films
Hungarian comedy-drama films
English-language Hungarian films
Films set in Florida
Hungarian LGBT-related films
LGBT-related comedy-drama films
2014 comedy-drama films
2014 LGBT-related films
2010s English-language films